Albert Nerenberg (born October 13, 1962) is a Canadian independent filmmaker, actor, journalist, hypnotist, and laughologist. His films include Stupidity (2003), Escape to Canada (2005), Let's All Hate Toronto (2007), Laughology (2009), Boredom (2012) and You Are What You Act (2018). Both Stupidity and Laughology are the first feature-length documentaries to discuss the topics of stupidity and laughter.

Early life and education
Born in London, Ontario, in 1962, Nerenberg studied English Drama at McGill University in Montreal during the 1980s, where he formed Theatre Shmeatre, an improvisational theatrical company, and served as editor in chief of the McGill Daily.

Journalist
Nerenberg was a newspaper reporter with the Montreal Gazette and talk radio host at CKGM.

Nerenberg still occasionally publishes articles.

Film career
Nerenberg told the Montreal newspaper, La Presse, that he became a filmmaker after he smuggled a video camera through army lines during the 1990 Oka Crisis – a standoff between armed Mohawk Warriors and the Canadian military. The footage was later turned into his first documentary, titled Okanada.

While still based in Montreal, some of Nerenberg's earliest films received acclaim, as well as some skepticism, "on the fringes" with "highly entertaining, low-budget documentaries", like Urban Anglo (1991) and 1949, so titled because it cost only $19.49 to make, taking advantage of the sophistication of Hi-8 video equipment at that time. Nerenberg was recognized by the Cinémathèque Québécoise as a film innovator for having had a role in some of the developments in contemporary filmmaking; including the hand-held revolution, the Truvie where fictional films are shot in real situations, and in creating the format of fictional movie trailers. In 2001 Nerenberg was the subject of a retrospective at the Just for Laughs festival in Montreal.

Trailervision
Nerenberg moved to Toronto, "like many young Montreal anglo filmmakers before him," where he would eventually achieve even greater acclaim with higher-budget, more entertaining documentaries. First, he founded Trailervision, with the premise that film trailers are a form of artistic expression in their own right. CNN called it an "international cult phenomenon." Nerenberg directed over 70 trailers for it.

In 2000, he performed a widely publicized prank at the 2000 Toronto International Film Festival. The director orchestrated the red carpet entry of a group of Trailervision actors as major movie stars. This was done by planting actors among the paparazzi who screamed the names of the fictional stars as they arrived by limo. The paparazzi responded by flashing their cameras frantically. The fake stars were rushed into the green room along with the real stars, "where they got drunk like showbiz kings". The prank is described in the online Museum of Hoaxes as The Toronto Film Festival Hoax.

Feature documentary filmmaker
In 2003, Nerenberg's breakthrough film Stupidity was released, and he organized the first annual World Stupidity Awards in Toronto a month later, a satirical awards show which went on to be sponsored by the Just for Laughs festival and took place in Montréal from 2004 to 2007, honouring the Stupidest Statement of the Year.

Nerenberg's Escape to Canada (2005) examines the results of Canada's brief relaxation of its marijuana laws at the same time that same-sex marriage became legal, along with Canada's abstention from the U.S.-led invasion of Iraq having made the country a perceived haven for progressive Americans.

In 2007's Let's All Hate Toronto, Mr. Toronto (Nerenberg's eye-patched co-director Rob Spence) embarks on a coast-to-coast Canadian tour to promote "the centre of the universe" by waving a banner that reads "Toronto Appreciation Day." Not long after, Nerenberg moved from Toronto with his significant other and child to take up residence in the Eastern Townships burgh of West Bolton, "where he does much hiking and laughing when not lecturing or making movies elsewhere."

His next two films, Laughology (2009) and Boredom (2012), both discuss aspects of phenomena as they are related to health and happiness which have gone relatively unexplored by science. Nerenberg organized the first Montreal Laughing Championships after attending a UFC fight were two fighters unintentionally started laughing during a stare down. "Punching people in the face is a sport. Poking people with sticks is a sport. Why not have a sport about the pursuit of joy?" Nerenberg told The Pacific Standard. Using stare-downs and laughing fits, 12 competitors would compete to see who was the champion. The laughers would be judged for their contagiousness effect on the audience. After that event, laughing championships would be organized worldwide. Nerenberg frequently tours and speaks as a Laughologist, an expert on laughter. After traveling to India and studying the benefits of Laughter Yoga with Dr. Madan Kataria, Nerenberg invented Laughtercize, a system of joy-inducing exercise that works off natural human contagious laughter. This technique has been used in a number of Canadian alcohol and drug rehab centres. He also invented the Laughter Party, which creates the same atmosphere as a wild party, without the need of drugs and alcohol.

You Are What You Act (2018) points out how film actors often become their roles and suggests these principles apply to ordinary people in terms of actualizing confidence, heroism, health and love. It won the Jury Prize at the Illuminate Film Festival in Sedona, Arizona, in June 2018.

Live performance: The Hypnotic Bar
At IdeaCity in 2014, Nerenberg made a controversial presentation suggesting that all drug and alcohol states can be replicated with hypnosis. He demonstrated by inviting volunteers from the audience. Under hypnosis he made one volunteer apparently drunk, while another on cocaine and two others on ecstasy. To conclude he asked the audience to invent a drug on the spot, which volunteers might experience. One audience member suggested "Ludicron" a drug which causes people to laugh and "think the audience is naked." When the drug state was implemented a volunteer laughed and screamed and claimed she could see hundreds of naked people.  Nerenberg launched a project called The Hypnotic Bar, a kind of temporary night club where people are hypnotized to be drunk while drinking only water. Nerenberg said he got the idea of the Hypnotic Bar after coming across a statistician stating that more people are currently dying of drug and alcohol overdoses than at any other time in human history.

In a speech at TEDx Queens, Nerenberg challenged the audience to take standard tests of hypnotizability. Many supposed audience members appeared to go to sleep, and some seemed to act like chickens. Nerenberg proposed that hypnotic chicken behaviour reveals a key aspect of human nature, that we believe our dreams.

References

External links

Albert Nerenberg Hypnotist 
Albert Nerenberg Laughologist

1962 births
Living people
Anglophone Quebec people
Film directors from London, Ontario
Jewish Canadian male actors
Journalists from Ontario
Journalists from Quebec
Canadian columnists
Canadian documentary film directors
Male actors from London, Ontario
Film directors from Quebec
McGill University alumni
Canadian radio personalities
Jewish Canadian journalists
Jewish Canadian filmmakers
Canadian documentary film producers
Film producers from Ontario
Film producers from Quebec